Skryabin (also transliterated as Scriabin or Skriabin) is a Ukrainian rock, pop band formed in 1989 in Novoyavorivsk, Ukraine. Prominent Ukrainian musician Andriy "Kuzma" Kuzmenko was the band's lead singer until his death in 2015.

During its existence, Skryabin has gone from synthpop to rock and pop music. As it progressed, the band's style has been divided into "classic Skryabin" and "new Skryabin". This transition took place between 2000-2003.

The group was named "Best Pop Band" in 2006 at the "ShowBiz Awards” held in Kyiv's National Opera House.

Private archive leak 
In 2015-2016,just after Skryabin died.On ex.ua,an unknown user posted Skryabin's unreleased tracks,which dedicate from 1986(demos,before even the band formed) to 2000's and 2010's.This archive zip file also contained a lot of unreleased songs from the early years,1986 to 1990s(such as Буржуазниє or an unreleased version of "Нема нас/predecessor of "Шось зимно" from 1986 and 1988).After the incident,the whole forum page had lost all the files and pieces,these were most likely reposted to Youtube.The person who released is still debated,although all informations from the zip files were checked,it is still a mistery.

Discography 
This list contains only full albums excluding singles, compilations, remixes, lives and other projects.
 1989 — Чуєш біль (Feel The Pain)
 1992 — Мова риб (Fish Language)
 1993 — Технофайт (Technofight)
 1995 — Птахи (Birds)
 1997 — Мова риб (Fishes Language, re-release)
 1997 — Казки (Fairytales)
 1999 — Хробак (Worm)
 1999 — Еутерпа (Euterpa)
 1999 — Технофайт 1999 (Technofight 1999)
 2000 — Модна країна (Fashionable Country)
 2001 — Стриптиз (Striptease)
 2002 — Озимі люди (Winter People)
 2003 — Натура (Nature)
 2005 — Танго (Tango)
 2006 — Гламур (Glamour)
 2007 — Про любов? (About Love?)
 2009 — Моя еволюція (My Evolution)
 2012 — Радіо Любов (Radio Love)
 2013 — Добряк (Kind Soul)
 2014 — 25
 2015 — Кінець фільму (End Of The Movie)

References

External links 

Skryabin on Facebook

Ukrainian rock music groups
Ukrainian alternative rock groups
Musical groups established in 1989
Soviet rock music groups